BYU Noteworthy is a nine-member, female Brigham Young University (BYU) a cappella group, based in Provo, Utah, United States. They won 1st place at the International Championship of Collegiate A Cappella (ICCA) in 2007 and appeared on the first season of NBC's a cappella competition reality show The Sing-Off in 2009. Esther Yoder formed the group in 2003, aided by members of BYU's Vocal Point. Noteworthy began operating under the direction of the Performing Arts Management (PAM) at BYU in 2014. One of their most popular music videos is a cover of Amazing Grace, which won the Contemporary A Cappella Society (CARA) award for Best Religious Video and has garnered millions of views on YouTube since its release. Noteworthy has released six albums since its formation in 2003. In 2018, Noteworthy performed "Come Thou Fount of Every Blessing" for a Mormon Message for the Church of Jesus Christ of Latter-day Saints (LDS Church).

A former member of Noteworthy, Amy Whitcomb, appeared on the fourth season of The Voice; she was eliminated in the knockout rounds, but served as Noteworthy's director from 2018 to 2021.

History
Noteworthy was founded in 2003 by BYU student Esther Yoder. She consulted with co-founder and then-director of Vocal Point, Bob Ahlander, and recruited Vocal Point members Dave Brown and Dan Dunn to help create the new group. The group was established with nine female members in 2004. Noteworthy competed in the ICCA in 2004. In the semifinal round, Noteworthy placed second in the West region, and Yoder received the award for Most Outstanding Vocal Percussion, the first woman to receive the award. In 2006, the group released its debut album, On the Horizon. They again competed at the ICCA and placed second to Vocal Point in the Quarterfinal round. Noteworthy member Camille Hancock won the award for Most Outstanding Choreography. A Bulgarian track on the album, "Kaval Sviri," was nominated for a CARA Recording Award in the best female collegiate song category.

In 2007, Noteworthy took first place in the Quarterfinals, Semifinals, and the Final round of the competition at the Lincoln Center in New York City, making them the 2007 International Champions. Director Catherine Papworth received the Most Outstanding Arrangement Award for "How Great Thou Art" in both the Quarterfinal and Semifinal rounds. Member Kristin Papworth received the award for Most Outstanding Choreography for Noteworthy's full set in the Finals round.
The group's second album Green Means Go was released in 2009. "Listen," a cover track from Green Means Go was selected to appear on the Best of Collegiate A Cappella (BOCA) compilation for 2010. In 2009, Noteworthy appeared on NBC's a cappella competition reality show The Sing-Off. The show debuted on NBC on December 14, 2009. Noteworthy was eliminated in the second episode on December 15, 2009.

After performing on The Sing-Off, Noteworthy went on to compete in the ICCA quarter finals in Eugene, Oregon, where they took first place and the award for Outstanding Choreography, Outstanding Soloist, Outstanding Arrangement, and Outstanding Vocal Percussion. Noteworthy's third album Defined was released in 2010. The CD received four CARA nominations, Best Scholastic Original Song, Best Female Collegiate Album, Best Female Collegiate Solo, and Best Female Collegiate Arrangement. In 2012, Noteworthy performed in two joint concerts with the Whiffenpoofs of Yale while the ensemble was on tour in Utah.  The same year, Noteworthy competed in the ICCA, taking first place at the Quarterfinal. Former members Amy Whitcomb and Laina Walker were featured on the third season of NBC's TV Show The Sing-Off with a group called Delilah. Additionally, Whitcomb appeared on the fourth season of The Voice, where she was eliminated in the knockout rounds. In 2013, Noteworthy made its first YouTube music video.

In 2014, Noteworthy released a new album, "Unbound". On April 12, 2014, alumni traveled to Provo for a 10-Year Anniversary Concert, which included performances by the current Noteworthy group as well as past generations. In 2014, the group performed as an opener for Home Free, the Season 4 winning group of NBC's "The Sing-Off," on Memorial Day in Orem, Utah. In 2014, Noteworthy joined Vocal Point as the second university-sponsored a cappella group at BYU, under the administrative direction of BYU's PAM. Keith Evans, a former member of Vocal Point, was hired as the artistic director.

In 2015, Noteworthy gained significant popularity after recording and filming their cover of Amazing Grace, which has garnered millions of views since its release. Noteworthy's "Amazing Grace" won The Contemporary A Cappella Society award for Best Religious Video. They recorded two other music videos that year--"Star Wars: A Cappella Strikes Back" (a medley of Star Wars tunes) and "Be Thou My Vision". Noteworthy returned to compete in the ICCA, winning the Northwest Regional Round (with Sarah Cunha taking the award for Outstanding Vocal Percussion) but was unable to advance due to a scheduling conflict. Touring opportunities took them to the Four Corners to perform on The Today Show with Al Roker, opening for Jay Leno at the Tuacahn Center for the Arts, and a two-week mainstage tour in Nauvoo, IL.

In 2016, Noteworthy released a new 15-track album, "Ready for a Miracle". They also filmed three new music videos, including "Vivir Mi Vida" by Marc Anthony, "Gloria (Angels We Have Heard on High)", and "Unsteady" by X Ambassadors with the BYU Cougarettes; the latter two were released as new singles. The group performed at the University of Alaska Anchorage in October 2016 at the 23rd annual A Cappella Festivella; this was their first time performing outside of the continental United States. In 2017, Noteworthy released album, "How Sweet the Sound: Songs of Inspiration". In 2018, Noteworthy sang "Come Thou Fount of Every Blessing" for a Mormon Message for the LDS Church.

Directors, alumni, and members
Information obtained from Deseret Book and BYU Music Store.

Discography
Album discography retrieved from BYU Music Store. Single discography retrieved from Apple Music and the BYU Music Store.

Albums:
"This Is Noteworthy" (2021)
"How Sweet the Sound: Songs of Inspiration" (2017)
"Ready For A Miracle" (2016)
"Unbound" (2014)
"Defined"  (2010)
"Green Means Go" (2009)
"On the Horizon" (2006)

Singles:
”Oceans (Where Feel May Fail)” (2022)
”Olivia Rodrigo Medley: deja vu - drivers license - good 4 u” (2022)
"What Child Is This?" (2021)
"Salute" (2021)
"River Deep - Mountain High" (2021)
”Castles” (2021)
"Grow As We Go" (2021)
"Amazing Grace (feat. The Bonner Family)" (2021)
"The First Noel" (2020)
"Proud Mary" (2020)
"You Say" (2019)
"Bird Set Free" (2019)
"I Can Only Imagine" (2019)
"Hark! The Herald Angels Sing - Go Tell It on the Mountain" (2018)
"You'll Be in My Heart (From "Tarzan")" (2018)
"Feeling Good" (2018)
"Unsteady" (2017)
"Gloria (Angels We Have Heard on High)" (2016)
"Be Thou My Vision" (2016)
"Star Wars: A Cappella Strikes Back" (2015)
"Amazing Grace (My Chains Are Gone)" (2015)
"Geronimo" (2015)
"Madness" (2014)
"I Was Here" (2014)
"Feel Again" (2014)
"O Holy Night" (2013)
"I Knew You Were Trouble / We Are Never Getting Back Together" (2013)
"Without You / I Will Wait Mashup" (2013)

References

External links
BYU Performing Arts Management site

2003 establishments in Utah
Brigham Young University
Collegiate a cappella groups
Musical groups established in 2003
Musical groups from Utah
Harold B. Lee Library-related University Archives articles
History of women in Utah